"Three Sundays" is the fourth episode of the second season of the American television drama series Mad Men. It was written by Andre Jacquemetton and Maria Jacquemetton and directed by Tim Hunter. The episode originally aired on AMC in the United States on August 17, 2008.

The episode tackles on the professional and personal lives of three of its main characters - Don, Roger and Peggy - over the three most religious Sundays of the year. The workers at Sterling Cooper anxiously prepare for a pitch for American Airlines. Peggy develops a relationship with the priest at her church. Don meticulously tries to perfect the right presentation for their potential client. Roger tries to form a romantic relationship with a call girl.

Plot

Passion Sunday 
The episode begins with Peggy and her family at the Church of the Holy Innocents. In an attempt to leave, Peggy lies to her sister, Anita, and says that she feels sick. On her way out she meets Father Gill, a visiting priest. After a short conversation, Peggy decides to go back into the church for the rest of Mass.

Meanwhile, Don and Betty are sleeping in bed at home, but are woken up by a phone call from a friend about a barbecue that afternoon. They decide to cancel and spend the day relaxing around their house. Bobby is reprimanded for touching the stereo, but he lies about doing so. Later, he breaks the bed, increasingly angering Betty.

At the Olson residence, Father Gill comes over for dinner. During dinner, Peggy's mother expresses pride about Peggy's work in Manhattan. Father Gill offers Peggy a ride home, and asks for her advice on giving presentations because he has to deliver the sermon on Palm Sunday.

At a restaurant, Roger and Mona have dinner with their daughter Margaret and her fiancé, Brooks. Margaret doesn't want a big wedding, but Roger and Mona attempt to convince her otherwise.

Palm Sunday 
Father Gill stops at the Olson household and gives Peggy's sister and mother a copy of the sermon from that day to show to Peggy. Anita's jealousy starts to grow when she realizes Father Gill has taken a liking to Peggy.

At the Draper residence, Don is making pancakes when he receives a phone call from Duck that the American Airlines pitch has been moved up to Friday, and that Don must come into the office. While Don is distracted by the phone call, Bobby burns his chin on the pancake griddle. Betty has to take Bobby to the hospital, so Don brings Sally to work.

At Sterling Cooper, Duck organizes the American Airlines presentation. Not satisfied with their creative pitch, Don decides to change direction and chooses not to mention anything of the airline's past accident- instead focusing on the American future. As the workers focus on the pitch, Sally explores the office: listening in on adult conversations, asking Paul about his intimate relationship with his girlfriend, and finishing off someone's alcoholic beverage. Don notices that Sally was drinking, but does not say anything.
 
Not in attendance, Roger sleeps with a call girl named Vicki he met through Ken and Pete. He pays extra to engage in more romantic behaviors with Vicki and, afterwards, Roger convinces her to dine with him at Lutèce. 
 
On Good Friday, the Sterling Cooper crew perfectly prepares the boardroom for American Airlines. Moments before the meeting, Duck reveals that their client contact, Shel Kenneally, was fired that morning, essentially destroying their chances of landing the account. The Sterling Cooper team presents to the remaining American Airlines team, knowing there is no chance they will convince them. After the meeting, Don conveys his annoyance to Roger over Duck causing them to lose a client, instead of gain one. Roger counters by declaring his, "love of the chase" which makes victory much sweeter.

Later on that day, Anita makes a confession to Father Gill about her anger towards Peggy- revealing Peggy had an illegitimate child with a married man. Although stunned by this information, Father Gill tells Anita to try to forgive Peggy, since she is not as strong as Anita.

In the evening, Don and Betty get into an extremely heated argument about raising their children, particularly disciplining Bobby. Betty urges Don to hit Bobby, and expresses her anger that all of the punishing of the children must fall to her while Don gets to be out of the house all day. Bobby apologizes to Don for misbehaving, and asks Don about his late father. Before going to bed, Don reveals to Betty the abuse he suffered at his father's hands, and states that they should be grateful for a good child like Bobby. Betty silently apologizes.

Easter Sunday 
At the Holy Innocents’ Easter egg hunt, Father Gill thanks Peggy for advising him on giving his sermon. He gives an Easter egg to Peggy and tells her to give it to "the little one,” referring to her child. As he walks away, Peggy looks back disturbed, wondering if he knows her secret.

Reception
The episode has generally received positive reviews.  Noel Murray from The A.V. Club gave the episode an A stating that it gives “little slices of life, in which small gestures - Roger pining for his old ways, Peggy taking pride in the way her career aspirations impress an unattainable…” IGN gave the episode a rating of 8.7/10 explaining how the show “can bring the funny, but it excels in the sorrow.” Will Dean of The Guardian praised the episode for its attention to Peggy's personal life. He stated that the “whole plot was deftly done” and that Father Gill's presence “was a subtle and nuanced trick…." Predictable scenario made infinitely more interesting by keeping protagonists away from each other.” Sally Tamarkin from The Slate suggested for the episode to be used as an introduction for first-time watchers. She implied that if one needed to know a little backstory to Mad Men that “‘Three Sundays’ was the one to watch first.”

References

External links 
 

Mad Men (season 2) episodes
2008 American television episodes